Lécuyer Point is a point which forms the south side of the entrance to the harbor of Port Lockroy, Wiencke Island, in the Palmer Archipelago, Antarctica. It was discovered and named by the French Antarctic Expedition, 1903–05, under Jean-Baptiste Charcot.

References

External links

Headlands of the Palmer Archipelago